Basic People's Congress was the smallest administrative division in Libya under the Great Socialist People's Libyan Arab Jamahiriya from 1977 to 2011. Geographically it corresponded approximately to the level of a township or borough.

During Muammar Gaddafi's rule, political caucuses and committees of the Basic People's Congress operated at this level.  Representatives from the Basic People's Congresses regulated operations at the higher shabiyah (district) level.

In July 2013 the shabiyat and Basic People's Congress system was replaced with a new baladiyat system of ninety-nine first-level administrative divisions.

Notes and references

References
 Law, Gwillim (1999) "Libya" Administrative subdivisions of countries McFarland, Jefferson, North Carolina, p. 219, 

Former subdivisions of Libya
History of Libya under Muammar Gaddafi

pt:Congresso Básico do Povo (subdivisão de país)